Aayudham is a 2008 Malayalam-language film, directed by M. A. Nishad. The film stars Suresh Gopi, Thilakan, Bharathi, Karthika and Bala. The film had musical score by Alphonse Joseph and Biji Bal.

Plot

A bomb blast occurs at Vilayam, a beach town in Kerala. The case was first investigated by Mahendra Varma, who had arrested Anwar, the son of Abdullah, the muezzin. The chief minister, Madhavan appoints Hrisikesh IPS to investigate the crime. His team include CI Rappayi and DYSP Hamza.

Hrishi and his team find out that Chackochan, a political leader, Mahendra Varma and Paulachan another political leader are behind it. He finds out that the real culprit behind them is Sammy Anthony Williams, a rich NRI businessman. The movie ends with the chief minister giving Anwar a job and praising Hrishi and his team for finding out the culprits

Cast

References

External links
 

2008 films
2000s Malayalam-language films
Films directed by M. A. Nishad